A badminton tournament was held at the  2001 Southeast Asian Games in Malawati Stadium, Selangor, Malaysia from 9 to 15 September 2001.

Medalists

Results

Men's team

Quarter-final

Semi-final

Final

Women's team

Semi-final

Final

Men's singles

Final

Top half

Bottom half

Women's singles

Men's doubles

Women's doubles

Mixed doubles

Medal tally
Legend

References

Page 21

External links
 
Competition Schedules 

Bad
2001
Southeast Asian Games
2001 Southeast Asian Games